Piz de Cressim (also known as Piz de Roggione) is a mountain of the Lepontine Alps on the Swiss-Italian border. On its west side lies the Val Cama and on its east side lies the Valle Bodengo. It is popular among climbers and mountain walkers.

References

External links
 Piz de Cressim on Hikr

Mountains of the Alps
Mountains of Switzerland
Mountains of Italy
Mountains of Graubünden
Lepontine Alps
Italy–Switzerland border
International mountains of Europe
Two-thousanders of Switzerland
Soazza